M. inornatus may refer to:
 Mermessus inornatus, a money spider species in the genus Mermessus
 Micropterix inornatus, a moth species in the genus Micropterix
 Modisimus inornatus, a house spider species in the genus Modisimus
 Myiophobus inornatus, a bird species

See also
 Inornatus